Arthur Norreys Worthington (February 17, 1862 – February 7, 1912) was a Canadian physician, surgeon, soldier, and politician.

Biography 
Born in Sherbrooke, Canada East, the son of Edward Dagge Worthington (1820–1895), Worthington was educated at the Sherbrooke Academy, Bishop's College and McGill University. A physician and surgeon, he was surgeon to the 53rd Regiment and to the Sherbrooke Protestant Hospital. He served in the North-West Rebellion in 1885, where he was awarded a medal and clasp and was mentioned in dispatches. He took part in the South Africa Campaign in 1900–1901 and was awarded a medal and three clasps and was named in dispatches. He was promoted Lieutenant-Colonel for South African Service and appointed P.M.O. of the 5th and 6th District.

From 1901 to 1902, he was mayor of Sherbrooke. He was elected to the House of Commons of Canada for the riding of Sherbrooke in the 1904 federal election. The election was declared void in 1905 and he was acclaimed in the resulting 1906 by-election. A conservative, he was re-elected in the 1908 federal election.

He was a governor of the College of Physicians and Surgeons of the Province of Quebec and President of the District of St. Francis Medical Association.

In September 1887, he married May Cook, daughter of Hermon Henry Cook, former M.P. for Simcoe North.

He died in Sherbrooke on February 7, 1912.

Electoral record 

By-election: On election being declared void, 4 December 1905

References 

The Canadian Parliament; biographical sketches and photo-engravures of the senators and members of the House of Commons of Canada. Being the tenth Parliament, elected November 3, 1904
Worthington Family Fonds

External links 

1862 births
1912 deaths
Canadian military doctors
Conservative Party of Canada (1867–1942) MPs
Mayors of Sherbrooke
Members of the House of Commons of Canada from Quebec
McGill University alumni
Anglophone Quebec people
Physicians from Quebec